Rafael Alexandre de Sousa Gancho de Brito (born 19 January 2002) is a Portuguese professional footballer who plays as a midfielder for C.S. Marítimo on loan from S.L. Benfica.

Football career
Born in Almada, Brito made his professional debut with Benfica B in a 2–1 win over Estoril Praia in LigaPro on 11 August 2019.

Honours
Benfica
 UEFA Youth League runner-up: 2019–20

References

External links

2002 births
Living people
Sportspeople from Almada
Portuguese footballers
Association football defenders
S.L. Benfica B players
Liga Portugal 2 players
Portugal youth international footballers